Qikiqtaaluk (ᕿᑭᖅᑖᓗᒃ), formerly White Island, is one of the uninhabited Canadian arctic islands in the Kivalliq Region, Nunavut, Canada. Located in Foxe Basin off the northern tip of Southampton Island, it measures  in area.

White Island is separated from Southampton Island by the narrow (less than  Comer Strait to the west, and Falcon Strait to the south. There are several capes including Cape Middleton, Cape Frigid, and Cape Deas. Whale Sound and Toms Harbour are on the eastern coast, and Frozen Strait is just beyond. White Island is surrounded by several small islands including Passage Island, Whale Island, Seekoo Island, Nas Island, as well as many that are unnamed.

References

Islands of Foxe Basin
Uninhabited islands of Kivalliq Region